Baccara may refer to:

 Baccara, a Spanish female vocal duo
 Baccara (album), debut studio album by Spanish duo Baccara
 Baccara (card game), a card game
 Baccara (film), a 1935 French comedy film directed by Yves Mirande
 Baccara, a deep red rose

See also 

 Baccarat (disambiguation)